Nocardioides marinus is a Gram-positive, slightly halophilic and rod-shaped bacterium from the genus Nocardioides which has been isolated from seawater from the Sea of Japan near Korea.

References

Further reading

External links
Type strain of Nocardioides marinus at BacDive -  the Bacterial Diversity Metadatabase	

marinus
Bacteria described in 2007